The Chicago mayoral election of 1943 was first the primary on February 22, 1943, which was followed by the general on April 6, 1943. The election saw incumbent Edward J. Kelly being reelected to a third term, defeating Republican nominee George McKibbin with a 9% margin of victory. Both nominees had received landslide victories in their party's primary elections.

Nominations

Democratic primary
Reform-oriented Democrats supported a challenge by alderman John S. Boyle to incumbent mayor Edward J. Kelly. This challenge failed to amount to much, with Kelly easily defeating Boyle.

Republican primary
George McKibbin won the Republican nomination by a landslide margin.

General election
Like other Republicans that had run against Kelly, McKibbin framed his campaign as a crusade against machine politics. McKibbin declared "Pendergast is out in K.C., Hague in Jersey, and Tammany in New York have been cleaned out. Now it is time to clean out the Kelly-Nash machine." McKibbin also attacked links between the political machine and criminal activity. Kelly did not campaign. Confident in his chances of victory, Kelly flaunted heavy gravitas and balked at the thought of campaigning.

Results
Voter turnout was considered to be very light. Kelly won what was considered to be a very solid victory.

References

Mayoral elections in Chicago
Chicago
Chicago
20th century in Chicago
1940s in Chicago